Torbjørn Sunde (born 16 February 1954) is a Norwegian jazz trombonist who has worked with Terje Rypdal, Edward Vesala, Jon Balke, Knut Værnes, Rickie Lee Jones, Randy Crawford, Dr. John, Jan Eggum, Jan Garbarek, and Mezzoforte.

Musical career
After growing up at Gjøvik he got a bachler in football from Norges Idrettshøgskole, and a master in musicology at University of Oslo. He participated on a number of recordings with Terje Rypdal (Odyssey, 1975), Edward Vesala (1977), Oslo 13 (awarded Spellemannprisen in 1988, for the album Off Balance), Oslo Rhythm & Blues Ensemble, Four Roosters, Etno Funk, Chipahua, Horns for Hire, Jazzpunkensemblet, and Mezzoforte.

He has participated on releases by Jon Eberson (Stash, 1988), Jon Balke (Nonsentration, 1990) and Knut Værnes (1993). He worked with Rickie Lee Jones, Randy Crawford, Dr. John, Jan Eggum (Deilig, 1999) and Jan Garbarek.

He led his own orchestra "Meridians of Music" (with such musical profiles as Terje Rypdal, Bugge Wesseltoft, Eivind Aarset and Jon Balke), and the "Torbjørn Sunde Octet" (with Jon Eberson, Rob Waring, Morten Halle, Håvard Lund, Trude Eick, Aslak Hartberg and Jens Petter Antonsen) with album releases. He also had his own Quartet with Tom Olstad, Roy Powell and Per Mathisen (The Blue Note sessions).

Speedskater
In his youth, Sunde was a very promising speedskater representing "Gjøvik Skøiteklub". In 1971, at the age of 17, he skated 500 meters in 41.5 seconds. Sunde participated in three sprint NM (Norgesmesterskap) in 1971, 1972 and 1973, with a 9th place as the best in 1973.

He is the younger brother of speedskater Arnulf Sunde (1976 Winter Olympics participant).

Awards and honors
Spellemannprisen 1988 in the class Jazz, with Oslo 13 for the album Off Balance

Discography
 Meridians (ACT, 1998)
 Where Is the Chet (K&K, 2001)

References

External links 
Torbjorn Sunde Confronting Hemispheres from the album Meridians on YouTube

1954 births
Living people
Musicians from Gjøvik
1300 Oslo members
20th-century Norwegian male musicians
20th-century Norwegian trombonists
21st-century Norwegian male musicians
21st-century Norwegian trombonists
21st-century trombonists
Jazzpunkensemblet members
Male jazz composers
Male trombonists
Norwegian jazz composers
Norwegian jazz trombonists
ACT Music artists